USS LST/LST(H)-486 was an  built for the United States Navy during World War II.

Construction
LST-486 was laid down on 31 December 1942, under Maritime Commission (MARCOM) contract, MC hull 1006, by  Kaiser Shipyards, Yard No. 4, Richmond, California; launched on 16 January 1943;  and commissioned on 29 May 1943.

Service history
During World War II, LST-486 was assigned to the Asiatic-Pacific Theater and participated in the following operations: the Capture and occupation of Saipan in June and July 1944; the Capture and occupation of Tinian in July 1944;  the Battle of Leyte landings October 1944; and the Lingayen Gulf landings January 1945.

Post-war service
Following the war, LST-486 was redesignated LST(H)-486 on 15 September 1945. She performed occupation duty in the Far East in January 1946. Upon her return to the United States, she was decommissioned on 13 January 1946. The tank landing ship was operated by the Shipping Control Authority, Japan, until destroyed on 23 July 1947. Her name was struck from the Navy list on 28 August 1947.

Awards 
LST-486 earned four battle stars for World War II service.

Notes 

Citations

Bibliography 

Online resources

External links

 

LST-1-class tank landing ships of the United States Navy
Ships built in Richmond, California
1942 ships
World War II amphibious warfare vessels of the United States
Branch County, Michigan
S3-M2-K2 ships